Sheree Renée Thomas is an African-American writer, book editor, publisher, and contributor to many notable publications. In 2020, Thomas was named editor of The Magazine of Fantasy & Science Fiction.

Career 
Thomas is the editor of the Dark Matter: A Century of Speculative Fiction from the African Diaspora anthology (2000) and Dark Matter: Reading the Bones, Dark Matter, winners of the 2001 and the 2005 World Fantasy Award for Best Anthology, which collect works by many African-American writers in the genres of science fiction, horror and fantasy. Among the many notable authors included are Samuel R. Delany, Octavia E. Butler, Charles R. Saunders, Steven Barnes, Tananarive Due, Jewelle Gomez, Ishmael Reed, Kalamu ya Salaam, Robert Fleming, Nalo Hopkinson, George S. Schuyler and W. E. B. Du Bois. Dark Matter received the 2005 and the 2001 World Fantasy Award and was named a New York Times Notable Book of the Year.

Thomas is the author of Nine Bar Blues: Stories from an Ancient Future (Third Man Books, 2020), the multigenre collections, Sleeping Under the Tree of Life, longlisted for the 2016 James A. Tiptree, Jr. Award and Shotgun Lullabies: Stories & Poems, is publisher of Wanganegresse Press, and has contributed to national publications including The Washington Post, The New York Times, Book World, Black Issues Book Review, QBR, and Hip Mama. Her fiction and poetry has been widely anthologized and appears in "The Big Book of Modern Fantasy (1945-2010),"  in Ishmael Reed's Konch, Drumvoices Revue, Obsidian III, African Voices, storySouth, and other literary journals, and has received Honorable Mention in the Year's Best Fantasy and Horror, 16th and 17th annual collections. A native of Memphis, Thomas lived in New York City for over two decades and is now based in her hometown. In Fall 2020 she was named the tenth editor of The Magazine of Fantasy & Science Fiction, founded in 1949. She also serves as the Associate Editor of Obsidian: Literature & Arts in the African Diaspora, founded in 1975.

Publications
 Anansi (1999)
 Dark Matter: A Century of Speculative Fiction from the African Diaspora (2000), New York Times Notable Book of the Year, winner of the World Fantasy Award for Year's Best Anthology, Gold Pen Award
 "The Last Moonsong", story in Role Call: A Generational Anthology of Social and Political Black Literature & Art (2001)
 "For the Distinguished Historian...", poem in Role Call: A Generational Anthology of Social and Political Black Literature & Art (2001)
 "The Road to Khartoum", poem in Bum Rush the Page: A Def Poetry Jam (2001), ed. Tony Medina and Louis Reyes Rivera.
 "How Sukie Come Free", story in Mojo: Conjure Stories ( 2003 )
 "The Grassdreaming Tree", story in  So Long Been Dreaming: Postcolonial Science Fiction and Fantasy (2004), ed. Nalo Hopkinson and Uppinder Mehan
 Dark Matter: Reading the Bones (2004), winner of the World Fantasy Award for Year's Best Anthology
 "Marrakesh" and "Sky in West Memphis", poems in storySouth (2005)
 "In the Negro Section of Nashville" and "On Entering William Edmondson's Sculpture Yard in Nashville", poems in storySouth (2005)
 "Graze a Dark Field", poem in Essence Magazine (2006)
 "Praisesong on the Passage of a Brilliant Star, from a Dreamer Below", essay in Callaloo, Volume 29.2 (2006)
 "Survivor at rest", poem in Hurricane Blues: Poems about Katrina and Rita (2006), ed. Philip C. Kolin and Susan Swartwout
 "Lore", poem in Southern Revival: Deep Magic for Hurricane Relief (2006), ed. Tamara Kaye Sellman
 "Ezilie in Cavaillon" in Mythic 2 (2006)
 "Untitled Old Scratch poem, featuring River" in Mythic Delirium (2006), nominated for the Pushcart Prize
 "Touch", story in ColorLines Magazine: The national magazine on race and politics// (2006)
 "sky in west memphis", poem, and "lightning" in The Ringing Ear: Black Poets Lean South (2007) ed. Nikky Finney
 "Malaika Descending", story in Bronx Biannual 2: The Journal of Urbane Urban Literature (2007), ed. Miles Marshall Lewis
 "What's Your Fantasy: MARVELOUS WORLD", article in VIBE (2007)
 "Fallen", poem in The 2007 Rhysling Anthology: The Best Science fiction, Fantasy, and Horror poetry of 2006, ed. Drew Morse (Science Fiction Poetry Association with Prime Books)
 "Bender's Bow", story in ColorLines Magazine: The national magazine on race and politics (2008)
 Two quotes featured in “Language Is a Place of Struggle”: Great Quotes by People of Color, ed. Tram Nguyen (Beacon Press, 2008)
 Five poems in Tempu Tupu! (Walking Naked): Africana Women's Poetic Self-Portrait edited by Nagueyalti Warren (Red Sea/Africa World Press, March 2008)
 “The Ferryman”, from Bonecarver in Afro-Future Females: Black Writers Chart Science Fiction’s Newest New Wave Trajectory, ed. Marleen S. Barr, foreword by Hortense Spillers (May 2008, Ohio State University Press,  and )
 "Touch", story reprinted in 80! Memories & Reflections on Ursula K. Le Guin, edited by Karen Joy Fowler and Debbie Notkin (Aqueduct Press, October 2010)
 Shotgun Lullabies: Short Stories & Poems (2011), Volume 28 in the "Conversation Pieces Series", Seattle, WA: Aqueduct Press, 
 "Introduction" (2015), in Salsa Nocturna by Daniel Jose Turner, Brooklyn, NY: Crossed Genres Press, 
 "Foreword: Birth of a Revolution" (2015), in Octavia's Brood: Science Fiction Stories from the Social Justice Movement, Oakland, CA: AK Press, 
 "The Dragon Can't Dance" (2015), in Transition Magazine, Issue 117, The Hutchins Center for African and African American Research at Harvard University, Cambridge, MA: Indiana University Press
 "Nightflight" (2015), in Memphis Noir, Brooklyn, NY: Akashic Press, 
 "River Clap Your Hands" (2015), in the Stories for Chip: A Tribute to Samuel R. Delany, Greenbelt, MD: Rosarium Publishing, 
 Obsidian: Literature and Arts in the African Diaspora (2016), Volume 42.1–42.2, "And So Shaped the World" in Speculating Futures: Black Imagination & the Arts, Normal, IL: Illinois State University, 
 "Treesong" (2016), in An Alphabet of Embers: An Anthology of Unclassifiables, Lawrence, KS: Stone Bird Press, 
 Sleeping Under the Tree of Life (2016), Volume 50 in the “Conversation Pieces Series”, Seattle, WA: Aqueduct Press, 
 "Tree of the Forest Seven Bells Turns the World Round Midnight" (2017), in Sycorax's Daughters, San Francisco, CA: Cedar Grove Publishing, 
 "Aunt Dissy's Policy Dream Book" (2017), in Apex Magazine and in Mojo Rising: Contemporary Writers, Jackson, MS: Sartoris Literary Group, 
 "Who Needs the Stars When the Full Moon Loves You" (2017), in Revise the Psalm: Works Celebrating the Writing of Gwendolyn Brooks, Chicago, IL: Curbside Splendor Press, 
 "Dear Octavia, Octavia E. Butler, Ms. Butler, Mother of Changes" (2017), in Luminescent Threads: Connections to Octavia E. Butler, Australia: Twelfth Planet Press, 
 "Graze a Dark Field", poem in Ghost Fishing: An Eco-Justice Poetry Anthology (2018), University of Georgia Press, 
 Africa Risen: A New Era of Speculative Fiction (2022), co-edited with Oghenechovwe Donald Ekpeki and Zelda Knight. TorDotCom, ISBN 9781250833006

 References 

 Sources 
 Bringing Challenging Feminist Science Fiction to the Demanding Reader (Aqueduct Press) 
 Thomas, Sheree Renée (The Encyclopedia of Science Fiction) 
 Sheree Thomas Bibliography site by Hachette Book Group
 Joe Monti's Scifi.com review of Dark Matter
 Pamela Sargent's review of Dark Matter: Reading the Bones
 Steven Silver's review of Dark Matter
 AALBC Author page with Sheree Thomas
 SHOTGUN LULLABIES: Stories & Poems by Sheree Renée Thomas
 Aqueduct Press Author page with Sheree Renée Thomas

External links

 Official Website of Sheree Renée Thomas 
 Blackpot Mojo — Sheree Thomas' Blog

 Sheree Thomas' publications in Drumvoices Revue
 Connected to Culture: A Conversation with Sheree Renée Thomas, Clarkesworld (July 2021)
 Afrofuturist Writer Sheree Renée Thomas, In the Green Room, Zocalo (September 30th, 2022) 
 Guest Lecturer Sheree Renée Thomas, Interview, Writing Workshop 

Interviews
 You Are Not Alone: An Interview with Sheree R. Thomas, ColoredGirls.com (2001)
 Black Science Fiction and Fantasy with Tananarive Due, Steven Barnes, and  Sheree R. Thomas on NPR, News & Notes, August 13, 2007 (Audio)
 Creating Dark Matter: An Interview with Sheree Renée Thomas, Strange Horizons'' (2009)
 Ambling Along the Aqueduct, "Aqueduct Press: Conversation Pieces" (2011)
  Sheree Renée Thomas' DARK MATTER - MEMPHIS Magazine (2014)
 , Black to the Future - Afrofuturism Comes to Memphis "TheCommercialAppeal.com" (April 13, 2018)
  It's Not Just Black Panther: Afrofuturism Is Having a Moment" - TIME Magazine (April 20, 2018)
  Dieselfunk Dispatch: BSAM MEMPHIS! With Sheree Renée Thomas, BleedingCool (April 21, 2018)

Science fiction editors
American book editors
People from Memphis, Tennessee
Living people
American science fiction writers
20th-century American short story writers
21st-century American short story writers
American women short story writers
American short story writers
Women science fiction and fantasy writers
Afrofuturist writers
1972 births
20th-century American women writers
21st-century American women writers
20th-century African-American women writers
20th-century African-American writers
21st-century African-American women writers
21st-century African-American writers